Hello Halo is the first album by Parker and Lily. It was released on August 21, 2001 via the label, Orange Recordings.

Track listing
"Two Years In Air" - 3:22
"Mandarin" - 2:05
"My Golden Arm" - 3:06
"P.S." - 3:29
"Waitress" - 3:00
"Tokyo" - 2:55
"Desert Holiday" - 3:46
"Morley" - 3:02
"Only Heartbreak For Me" - 2:58
"The World On Time" - 4:14
"What's An Oubliette?" - 1:26

References

External links 
 Orange Recordings

2001 debut albums
Parker and Lily albums